John Gabriel (born Jack Monkarsh; May 25, 1931 – June 11, 2021) was an American actor, singer-lyricist, and producer who is best known for his role as Seneca Beaulac on Ryan's Hope (1975–1985, 1988–1989), for which he received an Emmy Award nomination in 1980. Gabriel, who played the Professor in the original, unaired Gilligan's Island pilot, was the father of actress Andrea Gabriel. He appeared on Broadway in The Happy Time in 1968, and produced the shortlived eponymous television series Charles Grodin starring Charles Grodin in 1995.

Family
Gabriel was born in Niagara Falls, New York, the youngest of three children of Harry and Rae Monkarsh. His parents were of Polish Jewish/Russian Jewish descent. His father was born in then-Mandatory Palestine.

Career
Gabriel, throughout his career as an actor and singer, worked steadily in a wide variety of capacities. He appeared on stage in two Broadway productions, The Happy Time and the musical Applause, as well as off-Broadway in Fighting International Fat at the Playwrights Horizons. Gabriel played numerous character roles in film and television over a period of five decades.

He portrayed Pedro in the John Wayne movie El Dorado and also composed its title song in collaboration with Nelson Riddle.

He starred in Days of Our Lives, General Hospital, and Ryan's Hope.

From 1973 to 1975, he had a recurring role as WJM-TV sportscaster Andy Rivers on The Mary Tyler Moore Show.

As a singer, Gabriel appeared on numerous television shows, including The Ed Sullivan Show, The Merv Griffin Show, The Mike Douglas Show, and Regis and Kathy Lee, among others. He produced the Charles Grodin Show for six years.

Words and Music
In 2004, Gabriel wrote and produced, along with his actress wife Sandy Gabriel, best known for her role of Edna Thornton on All My Children, a nightclub act which he regularly toured across the United States. The show, titled Words And Music, was a celebration of classic American song interspersed with stories culled from Gabriel's vast experience in show business. In 2010, the production was videotaped in Los Angeles.

Death
John Gabriel died on June 11, 2021, at age 90.  His daughter attributed his death to complications from Alzheimer’s disease.

Selected filmography

Selected television appearances

References

External links

 Profile, Internet Broadway Database; accessed March 6, 2016.
 

1931 births
2021 deaths
American male television actors
American male film actors
American people of Polish-Jewish descent
American people of Russian-Jewish descent
Musicians from Niagara Falls, New York
Place of death missing
Male actors from New York (state)
American male singer-songwriters
Singer-songwriters from New York (state)